Madison.co.uk  are a British professional cycle racing team. At the beginning of 2009, they were known as Plowman Craven–Madison.co.uk and were a UCI Continental bicycle racing team.

History
Sponsored by geomatics company Plowman Craven in its inaugural season, the team won three National and one World title with Malcolm Elliot also taking the Elite Circuit Race Series. UK bicycle retailer Evans Cycles became a title sponsor after the first year to launch their own brand Pinnacle Bikes range. Evans Cycles then pulled out of the sponsorship after the first year of sponsorship.

The team's focus is senior professional events in the United Kingdom and second-tier road races such as the UCI Europe Tour.

PCA was among the first professional cycling teams to introduce "doping passports" to prevent blood doping in cycling when it launched its Race Clean initiative before to the 2007 Tour of Britain.

2006 riders
Kevin Barclay
Brian Biggs
Michael Lloyd
Simon Gaywood
Tony Gibb
Fredrik Johansson
James McCallum
Gordon McCauley
James Millard
Adam Norris
Graeme Gibbs 
James Taylor
Chris Badger

2007 riders
Tony Gibb
Gordon McCauley
James Taylor
Simon Gaywood
Michael Lloyd
James McCullum
James Millard
Graeme Gibbs
Richard Wilkinson
Freddy Johansson
Adam Norris
Brian Biggs
Jason Allen
Kevin Barclay

2008 riders
Tom Barras
Neil Coleman
Simon Gaywood
Tony Gibb
Alex Higham
James Jackson
James McCallum
Craig MacLean
James Millard
Evan Oliphant
Simon Richardson

Equipment
For the 2007 the Plowman Craven Evans Cycles race team were supplied bicycles by Pinnacle Bikes, a bicycle brand established by cycle retailer Evans Cycles.

For 2008 the team rode Pinnacle Bikes, namely Pinnacle Aeos Carbon Team Issue carbon fibre bikes, designed in the UK, and painted in matching team Pink & Blue colours. The team also tested new track and time trial models ready for consumer sale in the future. However these models didn't make it to market due to poor quality issues. Due to the quality issues, some riders used re-badged bikes from other manufacturers. Each rider was free to choose their own shoes and saddle from the ranges stocked by Evans Cycles.

In 2009 the team decided to end the co-ownership with bicycle retailer Evans Cycles. A new deal was struck with distribution company madison.co.uk. In May 2009, Plowman Craven withdrew their sponsorship of the team. The team lost a number of riders including Evan Oliphant and Ross Creber. The team became known as simply madison.co.uk.

References

External links
Evans Cycles official website
Pinnacle Bikes official website
Plowman Craven official website

Cycling teams based in the United Kingdom
Cycling teams established in 2006